The 2011 Jeonbuk Hyundai Motors season is the club's eighteenth season in the K-League. The club is competing in the K-League, League Cup, Korean FA Cup, and the AFC Champions League.

Current squad

Match results

K-League

League table

Results summary

Results by round

K-League Championship

Korean FA Cup

League Cup

AFC Champions League

Group round

Knockout round

Squad statistics

Appearances and goals
Statistics accurate as of match played 4 December 2011

Top scorers

Top assistors

Discipline

Transfer

In
3 July 2011 –  Kim Young-Woo – Gyeongnam FC

Out
7 July 2011 –  Yeom Dong-Gyun – Released (under arrest)
28 July 2011 –  Kang Seung-Jo – Gyeongnam FC

References

 Jeonbuk Hyundai Motors website

South Korean football clubs 2011 season
2011